Women's association football is a largely amateur sport in Russia, given the greater emphasis of the male competitions. As of 2018, there were 30,000 women playing football in Russia, with over 11,000 playing at an amateur level and only 200 playing professionally in the eight teams of the Russian Women's Football Championship.

History

In 1972 the Communist Party and banned women’s football because it believed it was  a “men’s sport. There is a great amount of stigma attached to women playing football in Russia. The Soviet women's football championship was founded in 1989.

League

The Russian Women's Football Championship is the national league of the country consisting of 8 professional teams.

National team
The Russia women's national football team has been qualified only twice in the FIFA Women's World Cup reaching the Quarterfinals (1999, 2003), and fives times in the UEFA Women's Championship, (1997, 2001, 2009, 2013, 2017).

On 28 February 2022, due to the 2022 Russian invasion of Ukraine and in accordance with a recommendation by the International Olympic Committee (IOC), FIFA and UEFA suspended the participation of Russia, including in the Qatar 2022 World Cup. The Russian Football Union unsuccessfully appealed the FIFA and UEFA bans to the Court of Arbitration for Sport, which upheld the bans.

See also
 Football in Russia

References